Dany Saval (born Danielle Nadine Suzanne Savalle; 5 January 1942) is a French former actress.

Her career flourished during the 1950s and 1960s. Best known in America as one of a trio of airline stewardesses being shuffled around by Tony Curtis and Jerry Lewis in the slapstick comedy Boeing Boeing, in which she played alongside Thelma Ritter, Christiane Schmidtmer, and Suzanna Leigh.

Dany Saval retired from the film and entertainment business in the late 1980s. She has a daughter named Stephanie Jarre (daughter of Maurice Jarre, her first husband), and currently resides in Paris with her fourth husband, Michel Drucker.

Selected filmography

External links 

1942 births
Living people
Actresses from Paris
French film actresses